The Valley Metro Regional Public Transportation Authority, more popularly known as Valley Metro, is the unified public brand of the regional transit system for the Phoenix metropolitan area. Within the system, it is divided between Valley Metro Bus, which runs all bus operations, and Valley Metro Rail, which is responsible for light rail operations in the Valley.

Valley Metro is a membership organization. Most services are separately funded and operated by individual cities and suburbs in the greater Phoenix region. These cities have agreed to participate in Valley Metro as a unifying brand name to streamline service and reduce confusion among riders. Each city appoints a representative to the RPTA board of directors, and a chairman, vice chairman, and treasurer are voted on amongst the board members for a one-year term.

The two largest operators of bus service are the city of Phoenix and the Regional Public Transportation Authority (operating multi-city routes and services primarily in Mesa, Chandler, Gilbert, and Tempe).  Circulator service in Glendale is operated by the city of Glendale directly, the Scottsdale Trolley circulators are contracted by the city of Scottsdale, and intra-city paratransit service in the cities of Glendale and Peoria are operated by the respective cities directly.

The RPTA operates a customer service, marketing and long-range transit planning operation from headquarters in downtown Phoenix which is shared among all Valley Metro member cities. A few routes which operate within several member cities have their funding and operations shared between those cities. Some RPTA funding is used to augment service provided by the member cities (this is expected to increase over the next several years due to a 2004 voter approval of an extension to the original 1985 sales tax for transit funding). The city of Phoenix alone operates 73 percent of all Valley Metro routes (several of which also serve suburban cities).

History

The RPTA was formed in 1985 as the result of Phoenix-area voters approving a one-half percent sales tax increase for expansion of the local freeway system, and for expansion of mass transit. The RPTA was then chartered under the laws of the state of Arizona. At the time, almost all transit service in the Phoenix area was operated by Phoenix Transit System, with a few other bus services such as in Mesa (Mesa Sunrunner) and Scottsdale (Scottsdale Connection) having started around 1990. Valley Metro, as an integrated regional transit service, did not begin operations under its own brand identity until 1993, when the RPTA board of directors chose that name, the logo, and color scheme as described below. At this time, Phoenix Transit System and Mesa Sunrunner were rebranded as Valley Metro, and several new routes operating under the RPTA were started.

Prior to the formation of the RPTA, the bus route structure of Phoenix Transit System was quite different, both in terms of numbering and routes. Previously, the bus system was based on a "hub-and-spoke" structure with most routes starting from downtown Phoenix. These routes were split in half by Central Avenue, which most routes used to access downtown Phoenix. For example, the western half of Van Buren Street was served by route 3W, and the eastern half of Van Buren Street was served by route 3E. Most bus routes inherited a seemingly arbitrary, but chronologically assigned, system from their Phoenix Street Railway heritage (for example, route 0-Central was originally numbered route 5). Express routes were numbered in the 80s and 90s (for example: route 510 serving Scottsdale was originally numbered route 90, which is today assigned to route 90-Dunlap/Cave Creek).

In the mid-1980s, the route structure was changed to form the basis for the system operating today. Most routes were restructured so that they would stay on a single street rather than be based out of the downtown terminal. Routes that operated on multiple streets were also split (for example, route 22-Camelback Crosstown covers parts of today's route 50 and route 72). The route numbering system was simplified so that bus routes were numbered according to the block number of the street that they operated on. For example, route 50-Camelback is numbered because it runs mostly on Camelback Road, which is in the 5000 block. Because of the establishment of route numbers in the 80s and 90s, the express routes were renumbered to the 500-series, where they remain today. The second digit of the 500-series express routes denotes the region of the metropolitan area where the bus is traveling to (for example, the 510 series go to Scottsdale, the 530 series go to Mesa, and the 570 series go to the Northwest Valley). The evolution to a full "supergrid" structure continues today as route branches are either replaced with circulators or separated into new routes.

Color schemes

Originally, the buses of one of Valley Metro's predecessors, Phoenix Transit System, were painted with an orange and pink stripe, and a logo on the sides, rear and front, featuring a character known as "Tico", which was a sun wearing sunglasses, and a sombrero. In the late 1980s, this logo disappeared and buses were simply labeled "City of Phoenix Transit System". In 1993–1994, the RPTA changed the colors to a green and purple color scheme (which many vehicles still have), with a green stripe and a large purple "V" on the passenger's side, and the reverse on the driver's side.

In 2006, a simplified color scheme was introduced with the delivery of the C40LFR buses. This scheme is similar to the previous scheme except that the "V" has been removed (it obscured visibility from inside the buses in many cases), there is only a green stripe around the bus, the Valley Metro logo is displayed on the front, rear, and rear sides of the bus, and the sides are lettered "Valley" in purple and "Metro" in white. All new buses delivered to the RPTA from 2006 onwards feature a new interior very similar to that of the Los Angeles County Metropolitan Transportation Authority (LACMTA) but with darker tinted windows, no Transit TV (since all Valley Metro divisions except for the City of Phoenix divisions and Valley Metro Rail prohibit advertising), and blue seat fabric (as opposed to the "rainbow" seat fabric used on LACMTA buses). Buses delivered to the city of Phoenix from 2006 to 2008 feature a similar interior to those delivered from 1993 to 2006 but with the same seat fabric used on the RAPID bus rapid transit buses.

On December 27, 2008, Valley Metro introduced a new logo, replacing the "V" logo that had been in place since 1993. The green and purple colors were retained, but the green was made lighter and the purple was made darker. The new logo as well as the new shades of green and purple were introduced on the Valley Metro LINK arterial bus rapid transit service, as well as a new interior color scheme.

On October 30, 2009, Valley Metro introduced a concept paint scheme on two New Flyer C40LFR's which are serving as demonstration units for the new scheme.  The scheme consists of a silver body with a green and purple swoosh going from forward of the front wheel to the rear of the CNG tanks.  Riders were provided surveys which were collected and information reviewed.  This scheme became official on all RPTA-owned buses (not including the LINK buses) built since 2010.  The LINK buses used a variant of this scheme, with a purple front instead of silver.

In 2010, the City of Tempe introduced a variant of the new Valley Metro scheme with a green front instead of silver on one New Flyer L40LFR.  This became the official scheme for all Tempe-owned buses starting with the 2011 New Flyer C40LFRs.

In 2013, the City of Phoenix introduced a new scheme for its fleet.  They differ from the RPTA- and Tempe-owned fleet in that the body is mostly painted white and the green and purple swoosh wraps around the front and rear of the bus.  This modification in design was likely made to accommodate advertisements below the windows, since the City of Phoenix is the only operator (other than Valley Metro Rail) that allows advertisements on its fleet.

Service improvements under RPTA

In the early years of Valley Metro and throughout the 1990s, the Phoenix metropolitan area was the largest in the United States with transit service operating only Monday through Saturday, with no Sunday service or Saturday night service (after 8 p.m.) at all. Even on weekdays, some bus service ended as early as 7 or 8 p.m. This schedule was a huge hardship for a large portion of the Phoenix labor force (some of whom had to walk or bicycle long distances to and from work when bus service did not operate) and may have deterred some who wanted to relocate to the Phoenix area.

That began to change in 2001, when Valley Metro expanded to Sunday service in Phoenix, Glendale, and Scottsdale, with Tempe having Sunday service since 1999 (this resulted in large part from the approval of the Transit 2000 Regional Transportation Plan (RTP), which involved a new 0.4 percent sales tax in the city of Phoenix, with the other cities approving similar measures around the same time).

In 2002, the cities of Tempe and Scottsdale merged BOLT (Better Options for Local Transit) and Scottsdale Connection into the Valley Metro system in order to unify the Valley Metro brand and to reduce confusion (especially along the Red Line, which was operated by both Phoenix and Tempe and used Valley Metro and BOLT branded vehicles). All of the BOLT buses were repainted into standard Valley Metro colors (they still have a different interior from other Valley Metro buses) and the Scottsdale Connection buses were replaced. However, before the merger, the systems were featured in the Valley Metro Bus Book and had the same fare structure as the rest of the system, i.e. basically a different brand.

In addition, in 2004, Proposition 400 was passed, which extended a half-cent sales tax originally earmarked entirely for freeways. The tax was revised to provide funding for not only freeways, but "supergrid" bus service, (concentrated along Phoenix grid streets), bus rapid transit, and light rail extensions.

The rest of the service area still had no Sunday service as of the fall of 2008, with the exception of the portion of route 72 (see below) that runs into Chandler, the section of route 156 that runs across Chandler, and routes 61 and 96, which established regular Sunday service in selected portions of the city of Mesa in July 2008.  As of 2018, Sunday service is provided in the East Valley on all local routes except the 104-Alma School Road, 120-Mesa Drive, 128-Stapley Drive, 136-Gilbert Road, and 140-Ray Road.  As of 2018, Routes 45-Broadway and 77-Baseline do not serve Mesa on Sundays, and Route 96-Dobson does not serve Chandler on Sundays.

1989 ValTrans proposal
In 1989, a referendum took place in the RPTA constituent cities on expanded bus services (the fleet size would nearly have been tripled) and the implementation of elevated rail as part of a plan called "ValTrans".

The locations of three of Valley Metro's most heavily traveled bus routes (before the December 2008 start of light rail service) would have been the elevated rail lines' paths, and referred to by these color designations:
  Red Line, traveling from east Mesa to Metrocenter Mall in northwest central Phoenix, including stops at Arizona State University's main campus in Tempe, Phoenix Sky Harbor International Airport, and the downtown Phoenix business, sports, and entertainment corridor (the resulting bus line was the second most heavily used in the Valley Metro system).
  Blue Line, traveling from South Phoenix, through downtown and the Central Avenue corridor, along Camelback Road and the upscale Biltmore area, along 24th Street (passing the historic Arizona Biltmore resort), Lincoln Drive, a brief express portion on the State Route 51 freeway, 32nd Street, Shea Boulevard, Tatum Road, and eventually serving Paradise Valley Mall and Mayo Clinic Phoenix.
  Green Line, traveling along Thomas Road between Desert Sky Mall in West Phoenix, to the intersection of Thomas and 81st Street in the city of Scottsdale (the resulting bus line is now the most heavily used in the Valley Metro system). The color lines are no longer in service and were renamed as routes. The Green Line was renamed to Route 29 – Thomas Rd.
  Yellow Line, traveling from 83rd Avenue/Peoria, down Grand Avenue, a major arterial street which runs diagonally from the northwest into downtown Phoenix and is a major section of US 60) to the Washington/Jefferson couplet, and down Washington Street to Sun Devil Stadium and the ASU campus in Tempe. This route was discontinued in 2003, as a result of a road improvement project for Grand Avenue/US 60 led by the Arizona Department of Transportation; the project made Grand Avenue more expressway-like by eliminating seven major at-grade intersections on Grand in the cities of Phoenix and Glendale (the new overpasses/underpasses did not have bus stops, making transfers impossible). The part of the route that traveled on Washington was renamed Route 1-Washington, and the Grand Avenue segment was converted to the "Grand Avenue Limited" commuter bus route that operates during rush hours and makes only limited stops.
 Other routes, such as a commuter line to Chandler and an inter-city route serving Tucson.

Funding for would have come from a sales tax plan with a set expiration and reapproval date by 2019, a 30-year authorization period. The ValTrans proposal was soundly defeated at the polls. Concerns about noise, cost, and overall effectiveness were prominent, as well as voter frustration over the lack of progress on existing road and freeway construction.

Similar referendums were later voted down in 1993 and 1997, although Tempe voters passed a half-percent sales tax dedicated for transit (which partly allowed officials to study light rail) in 1996.

With the start of light rail service in December 2008, these color-coded designations were retired. The Red Line was eliminated altogether as most of the route is now covered by the light rail line (with several portions, including Metrocenter Mall, now also covered by Route 15 – 15th Avenue); the Blue Line was renamed to Route 39 – 40th Street and now terminates at the intersection of Camelback Road and Central Avenue; the Green Line was renamed Route 29 – Thomas (its original pre-ValTrans name); its routing remains unchanged.

Transit 2000 light rail proposal
In 2000, the Transit 2000 Regional Transportation Plan (RTP), which involved a 0.4 percent sales tax, was approved by voters in Phoenix. It sought to improve the local bus service and create bus rapid transit and light rail, among other things. Valley Metro Rail has a goal of a one-third farebox ratio, and the RTP anticipates this to rise to 45% by 2025. The plan implemented studies for further rail service, though for some time in the future. It also used the route placing and color designations from the 1989 plan.

Proposition 104 
In August 2015, Phoenix voters passed Proposition 104, increasing the sales tax allocated to transit from 0.4 to 0.7%. It is expected to partially pay for a $31 billion transit plan over 35 years. Under the plan, about half of the new revenue will go to bus service, a third to light rail, 7% to street improvements, and 10% to debt service.  of light rail are planned to be built.

Services offered

Bus service

Valley Metro operates bus routes around the Phoenix area through private companies in Phoenix, Mesa, Tempe, Glendale, and other parts of Maricopa County. These include fixed routes on city streets, suburban Express buses, RAPID buses, and circulators in parts of Phoenix, Glendale, Tempe, Mesa, Avondale, and Scottsdale.

Light rail

Valley Metro Rail operates a  route between the cities of Phoenix, Tempe, and Mesa. The system was most recently expanded in March 2016, with four additional extensions in the design or pre-construction phases, with expected opening dates ranging from 2018 to 2030. Future extensions include service to Metrocenter Mall, the Arizona State Capitol building, and Baseline Road, all in Phoenix.

Paratransit
Valley Metro offers paratransit for elderly and disabled residents via its Paratransit service.  Paratransit providers include:
 Valley Metro Paratransit (Contracted by the RPTA and operated by Transdev)
 Phoenix Dial-A-Ride (Contracted by the City of Phoenix and operated by MV Transportation)
 Glendale Dial-A-Ride (Operated by the City of Glendale)
 Peoria Dial-A-Ride (Operated by the City of Peoria)

Valley Metro Paratransit operates all trips outside the cities of Phoenix, Paradise Valley, Glendale, and Peoria, as well as regional trips (defined as trips that begin or end outside the boundaries of Phoenix, Paradise Valley, Glendale, or Peoria, with the other end of the trip within the boundaries of those cities/towns).  Phoenix Dial-A-Ride operates trips within the Phoenix city limits and the town of Paradise Valley.  Glendale Dial-A-Ride and Peoria Dial-A-Ride operate trips within the boundaries of their respective cities.  Service area boundaries vary by city, with some cities (specifically Avondale, El Mirage, Goodyear, Mesa, Paradise Valley, Scottsdale, Tempe, and Tolleson, as well as unincorporated areas of Maricopa County) only offering service within  of a fixed bus route while other cities offer service in a larger area (Chandler, Gilbert, Glendale, Peoria, and Surprise offering city/town-wide service, and Phoenix offering city-wide service south of Jomax Road).  To handle overflow demand, some trips on Valley Metro Paratransit and Phoenix Dial-A-Ride are outsourced to local taxi companies or to non-emergency medical transportation providers.

Rideshare
Other commuting options are coordinated by Valley Metro's Rideshare department, funded by contracts with Maricopa County and the Maricopa Association of Governments. The primary outreach effort of the Rideshare team is the Maricopa County Trip Reduction Program, which seeks to reduce traffic impacts on air pollution and emissions throughout the Valley. Any employer with 50 or more full-time employees is required to participate in the program, which seeks to convince employees to use transit alternatives. The 25,000 employees of State of Arizona government agencies who work and live in the Valley have their own Rideshare department, called Capitol Rideshare.

Public funding

Fares
The table at right shows the current fare structure for the Valley Metro system, since August 28, 2017.

Currently, all of the above passes (excluding 1-Ride trips) are sold on magnetic stripe cards, which must be activated when boarding a bus, or activated by a Ticket Vending Machine prior to boarding light rail. Failure to pay or activate appropriate fare when boarding a transit vehicle may carry a fine of up to $500.

Arizona State University (ASU) students and employees are eligible to participate in the ASU U-Pass program, allowing them to access the system at a discounted rate. Students, faculty, and other eligible staff may purchase their U-Pass from any ASU parking office.

Up to three children under the age of five riding with a fare-paying adult can ride free. Limited Stop service such as the Grand Avenue Limited are charged as local service.

As part of Proposition 104, (in 2015; see the "#Proposition 104" sub-section of this article) a replacement system using contactless cards is under development to replace the current system, and is provisionally scheduled for deployment in fiscal year 2017. The system will likely resemble the current Platinum Pass, which is only available through selected Phoenix-area employers and also the TAP card system, currently in use by the LACMTA in Los Angeles, including features like stored value, online account management, and mobile ticketing capabilities.

Valley Metro has used a contactless card system, the Platinum Pass, since 2011 in a limited capacity; the Platinum Pass is available exclusively through selected public and private-sector employers for distribution to their employees through their human resources (or dedicated ridesharing/transit) departments, with fares at least partially subsidized by the employer as part of the above-mentioned Trip Reduction Program (developed to control the air pollution problem long plaguing the Phoenix area). Any employee contribution to the fare is usually deducted from the employee paycheck. A similar ADA Platinum Pass is also available for qualifying people with disabilities.

See also
 List of rapid transit systems
 Metropolitan Phoenix Freeways
 METRO Light Rail
 Phoenix Public Transportation

References

Further reading

External links
 Valley Metro official site
 Valley Metro Rail
 City of Phoenix public transit department
 Maricopa County Regional Transportation Plan official site containing the current Regional Transportation Plan (RTP) and updated drafts
 Arizona Rail Passenger Association "A volunteer group of concerned citizens working for better rail passenger service in the Desert Southwest."
 Arizona Transit Association (AzTA) "A non-profit statewide organization dedicated to improving public transportation in all Arizona communities."
 Friends of Transit "The mission of Friends of Transit is the instruction of the public on the benefits and importance to the Greater Phoenix community of a well-designed and accessible mass transit system which represents a major component of a balanced regional transportation plan."

 
Intermodal transportation authorities in Arizona
Bus transportation in Arizona
Bus rapid transit in Arizona
Transit authorities with natural gas buses
Passenger rail transportation in Arizona
Light rail in Arizona
Transportation in Phoenix, Arizona
Transportation in Maricopa County, Arizona